Svema ( - 'Light-sensitive Materials') was a major Soviet-era state-owned manufacturer of the photographic film, mangetic tapes and cassetes based in Shostka, Sumy Oblast, Ukraine. The manufacturing was started in 1931, at the time, Ukrainian SSR, USSR.  Svema had a registered trade mark and formerly was referred as "NPO "Svema" of the Shostka Chemical Plant.

They made black-and-white photographic film, photographic paper, B&W motion picture film until 2010s, colour photographic and motion picture film until ~1995 and magnetic tapes until 2014. Svema products were known among enthusiasts as an easy and study product for beginners in home film development and printing.

The use of Svema color film was common for Soviet and post-soviet cinema from the late 1960s until the late 1990s with some student's works being shot on Svema up until 2010s.

Svema lost its market share in former Soviet Union countries to imported products during late 1990s when magnetic tapes were superceded by CDs. Due to lack of competitiveness and lifting iron curtain following collapse of the Soviet Union that opened up Ukraine to western markets the enterprise went bankrupt in 2015 and its main buildings were demolished in 2019.

History 
The manufacturing plant was founded in 1928 as a joint venture between Soviet government and French company Lumière that signed a contract to start production of celluloid photographic film in Soviet Union.

Color photographic films
* Svema DS-4 
Color Negative Film ISO/ASA 50

* Svema CO-32D
Color Reversal film ISO/ASA 32

* Svema CO-50d
Color Reversal film ISO/ASA 50

* Svema CND 64
Color Negative Film ISO/ASA 64

* Svema TsNL 65 
Color Negative Film ISO/ASA 80

* Svema LN-9
Color Negative Film, 35mm motion picture film stock

* Svema DS-5M
Color Negative Film, 35mm motion picture film stock

Tape

Reel to reel tapes

Black-and-white photographic films
Before 1987(old GOST speed scale)
 Svema Foto 32; 32 GOST, ISO 40/17°
 Svema Foto 65; 65 GOST, ISO 80/20°; sheet films 6.5×9 cm - 30×40 cm, KB, 6×9", bulk
 Svema Foto 130; 130 GOST, ISO 160/23°; KB, bulk
 Svema Foto 250; 250 GOST, ISO 320/26° (Daylight); 350 GOST, ISO 400/27° (Tungsten); KB, bulk

1987-1990(new GOST speed scale, same as ASA)
 Svema Foto 32; ISO 32/16°
 Svema Foto 64; ISO 64/19°
 Svema Foto 125; ISO 125/22°
 Svema Foto 250; ISO 250/25° (Daylight); ISO 320/26° (Tungsten)
 Svema Reporter; 200 GOST, ISO 200/24° (actually cinematographic filmstock); KB, bulk

After 1990(ISO speed scale)
 Svema Foto 50; ISO 50/18°
 Svema Foto 100; ISO 100/21°; KB, 6×9", bulk
 Svema Foto 200; ISO 200/24°; KB, bulk
 Svema Foto 400; ISO 400/27°; KB, bulk

See also
 :ru:Свема
 Astrum a company that took over some of Svema's manufacturing equipment after its closure
 Tasma

References

1931 establishments in Ukraine
Photography companies of Ukraine
Ukrainian brands
Chemical companies of the Soviet Union
Soviet brands
History of Sumy Oblast
Photographic film makers
Chemical companies established in 1931
Defunct photography companies